The Women's National Basketball Association All-Star Game Most Valuable Player (MVP) is an annual Women's National Basketball Association (WNBA) award given to the player voted best of the annual All-Star Game. The all-star game began during the 1999 WNBA season, the third year of the WNBA. There was no game held in 2004, 2008, 2010, 2012, or 2016.

Winners

Notes
In 2004, The Game at Radio City (held in place of a traditional All-Star Game) was a contest between the USA team scheduled to compete at the 2004 Summer Olympics and a single WNBA team. This is not considered an All-Star game. Yolanda Griffith of Team USA won the MVP award.
The 2008 WNBA All-Star Game was canceled due to the 2008 Summer Olympics.
In 2010, the Stars at the Sun game (held in place of a traditional All-Star Game) was a contest between the USA team scheduled to compete at the upcoming 2010 FIBA World Championship for Women and a single WNBA team. This is not considered an All-Star Game. Sylvia Fowles of Team USA won the MVP award.
The 2012 WNBA All-Star Game was canceled due to the 2012 Summer Olympics.
The 2016 WNBA All-Star Game was canceled due to the 2016 Summer Olympics.

See also

 List of sports awards honoring women
 WNBA All-Star Game
 WNBA Three-Point Contest
 WNBA Most Valuable Player Award
 NBA All-Star Game Most Valuable Player Award

References

All-Star, Mvp
Awards established in 1999
1999 establishments in the United States